Campo de Cartagena is a Spanish geographical indication for Vino de la Tierra wines located in the autonomous Region of Murcia. Vino de la Tierra is one step below the mainstream Denominación de Origen indication on the Spanish wine quality ladder.

The area covered by this geographical indication comprises the municipalities of Abanilla (except for Alicante DO), Fortuna, Cartagena, Torre-Pacheco, La Unión and Fuente Álamo de Murcia.

Authorized grape varieties
Red
Recommended: Garnacha, Monastrell, Tempranillo (or Cencibel),
Also authorized: Bonicaire, Cabernet Sauvignon, Forcallat, Garnacha tintorera, Merlot, Moravia dulce (or Crujidera), Petit Verdot, Syrah
White
Recommended: Airén, Merseguera (or Meseguera), Moscatel de Alejandría, Pedro Ximénez, Verdil, Viura (or Macabeo)
Also authorized: Chardonnay, Malvasia, Moscatel de grano menudo, Sauvignon blanc,

References

Spanish wine
Wine regions of Spain
Wine-related lists
Appellations